Košarkaški klub Šibenik, commonly referred to as KK Šibenik or simply Šibenik, was a men's professional basketball club based in Šibenik, Croatia. It was considered one of the best Croatian basketball clubs. In 2010, KK Šibenik bankrupted and was dissolved.

History
The club was founded on 27 December 1973 under the name Šibenka. During six seasons altogether club managed to qualify for the Yugoslav First Basketball League, then one of the best leagues in Europe. In 1983 Šibenka won the Yugoslav Championship final game against Bosna, but was later controversially stripped of the title. Two seasons in a row, 1982 and 1983, Šibenka played the finals of the Korać Cup but were defeated in both occasions by French side Limoges.

The club was famous for its youth academy which produced a lot of great players, greatest among them being the late Dražen Petrović, arguably the best European basketball player of all time.

In October 2010 the club was dissolved due to overwhelming financial problems. Currently, there are three basketball clubs in Šibenik - KK Jolly, GKK Šibenik and KK Dražen Petrović, but neither of them is considered a legal successor of the legendary KK Šibenik.

Name changes
KK Šibenka (1973–1992)
KK Šibenik Zagreb Montaža (1992–1994)
KK Šibenik (1994–1995)
KK Šibenik A.E.C. (1995–1996)
KK Šibenik (1996–1999)
KK Jadransko Osiguranje (1999–2000)
KK Šibenik (2000–2005)
KK Šibenka Dalmare (2005–2006) 
KK Šibenka (2006–2010)

Sponsors names 
KK Šibenik Zagreb Montaža (1992–1994) 
KK Šibenik A.E.C. (1995–1996) 
KK Šibenka Jadransko Osiguranje (1999–2000) 
KK Šibenik Sunce Osiguranje / Sunce Šibenik (2002–2004) 
KK Šibenka Dalmare (2005–2006)

Head coaches

  Branko Bukić 
  Ivica Slipčević 
  Nikola Kessler 
  Vojislav Vezović 
  Faruk Kulenović 
  Vlade Đurović 
  Dušan Ivković 
  Borislav Džaković 
  Anđelko Matov 
  Čedomir Perinčić 
  Joško Tus 
  Nenad Amanović 
  Anđelko Matov 
  Hrvoje Vlašić 
  Josip Pulja 
  Denis Bajramović 
  Nenad Amanović 
  Živko Badžim 
  Zoran Kalpić 
  Ivica Gulin &  Goran Zeljak 
  Nenad Amanović

Notable people

Players   

 Hüseyin Beşok
 Miro Bilan 
 Vedran Bosnić
 Ivica Burić
 Srećko Jarić
 Miro Jurić
 Aleksandar Petrović
 Dražen Petrović
 Nikola Radulović
 Zoran Slavnić
 Jeronimo Šarin
 Predrag Šarić
 Zoran Vrkić
 Luka Žorić 
 Ivica Žurić
 Sreten Đurić
 Živko Ljubojević

Coaches 
 Nenad Amanović
 Borislav Džaković
 Vlade Đurović
 Dušan Ivković 
 Faruk Kulenović
 Zoran Slavnić 
 Vojislav Vezović

Historical rosters 
 1977–78 Yugoslav Second League,
Coach:  Ivica Slipčević:
Šuperba, Ninić, Smolić, Milković, Škaro, Živković-Laurenta, Nenad Amanović, Babić, Ramljak, Bujas, Aleksandar Petrović, Lakoš, Batinica
 1978–79 Yugoslav Second League, 
Coach:  Nikola Kessler:
Jurković, Anđelić, Smolić, Goran Furčić, Nikola Jelavić, Bruno Petani, Nenad Amanović, Babić, Kašić, Predrag Šarić, Aleksandar Petrović, Nenad Slavica
 1979–80 Yugoslav First League,
Coach:  Vojislav Vezović:
Vučica, Fabijan Žurić, Kulušić, Ljubojević, Bruno Petani, Dražen Petrović, Zoran Slavnić, Branko Macura, Željko Marelja, Predrag Šarić, Babić, Nenad Slavica
 1980–81 Yugoslav First League,
Coach:  Vojislav Vezović:
Vučica, Fabijan Žurić, Kulušić, Jablan, Bruno Petani, Dražen Petrović, Zoran Slavnić, Branko Macura, Željko Marelja, Predrag Šarić, Srećko Jarić, Nenad Slavica
 1981–82 Yugoslav First League,
Coach:  Faruk Kulenović (1981–82 FIBA Korać Cup): 
Dražen Petrović, Fabijan Žurić, Robert Jablan, Živko Ljubojević, Bruno Petani, Sreten Đurić, Damir Damjanić, Branko Macura, Željko Marelja, Predrag Šarić, Srećko Jarić, Nenad Slavica
 1982–83 Yugoslav First League,
Coach:  Vlade Đurović (1982–83 FIBA Korać Cup):
Dražen Petrović, Milan Zečević, Ivica Žurić, Živko Ljubojević, Bruno Petani, Sreten Đurić, Damir Damjanić, Branko Macura, Željko Marelja, Predrag Šarić, Srećko Jarić, Nenad Slavica
 1983–84 Yugoslav First League,
Coach:  Vlade Đurović: 
Seper, Milan Zečević, Ivica Žurić, Živko Ljubojević, Bruno Petani, Sreten Đurić, Fabijan Žurić, Branko Macura, Željko Marelja, Predrag Šarić, Srećko Jarić, Zoran Livljanić
 2004–05 ABA Goodyear League,
Coach:  Hrvoje Vlašić: Danijel Papak, Jerome LeGrange, Ivan Duvančić, Denis Toroman, Dwayne Anthony Broyles, Josip Šarin, Zoran Huljev, Frano Čolak, Jure Rončević, Ivan Blaće, Srđan Helbich

Members of Basketball Hall of Fame 
  Dražen Petrović

See also
 KK Šibenik in European and worldwide competitions

Notes

References 

KK Šibenik
Basketball teams in Croatia
Basketball teams in Yugoslavia
Basketball teams established in 1973
Basketball teams disestablished in 2010
Defunct sports teams in Croatia
1973 establishments in Croatia
2010 disestablishments in Croatia